The Global Junior Heavyweight Tag League is an annual professional wrestling round-robin tag team tournament held by Pro Wrestling Noah since 2007. Originally known as the Nippon TV Cup Jr. Heavyweight Tag League and from 2011 until 2017 as the NTV G+ Cup Junior Heavyweight Tag League, the tournament was given its current name in May 2017. After a hiatus in 2020, the tournament was brought back in 2021, with a switch in focus from tag teams, to teams of 4.

The Global Junior Heavyweight Tag League is held under a round-robin system, with two points for a win, one for a draw and none for a loss. The teams finishing atop the points standings in the two blocks advance to the knockout stage, where the winner is determined in a head-to-head match. Matches in the Global Junior Heavyweight Tag League have a 30-minute time limit, which is the same as matches for Noah's GHC Junior Heavyweight Tag Team Championship.

In the below results,  signifies the GHC Jr Tag Team Champions at the time of each tournament. Usually the winners of the tournament earn a shot at the title, assuming they are not already the champions.

List of winners 
Nippon Tv Cup Jr. Heavyweight Tag League
2007: Kenta and Taiji Ishimori
2008: Kenta and Taiji Ishimori (2)
2009: Kotaro Suzuki and Yoshinobu Kanemaru
2010: Atsushi Aoki and Kenta
NTV G+ Cup Jr. Heavyweight Tag League
2011: Atsushi Aoki and Kotaro Suzuki
2012: Atsushi Kotoge and Taiji Ishimori
2013: Jushin Thunder Liger and Tiger Mask
2014: Hajime Ohara and Kenoh
2015: Atsushi Kotoge and Daisuke Harada
2016: ACH and Taiji Ishimori
Global Jr. Heavyweight Tag League
2017: Hayata and Yo-Hey
2018: Hayata and Yo-Hey (2)
2019: Kotaro Suzuki and Yoshinari Ogawa
Jr. Team Game

 2021: Tadasuke, Aleja, Haoh & Nioh

N Innovation U-Cup

 2022: Daisuke Harada, Atsushi Kotoge, Hajime Ohara & Junta Miyawaki

Results

2007 
The 2007 Nippon TV Cup Junior Heavyweight Tag League was held from July 1 to 15, 2007. The tournament featured six teams. Outside entrants included Bryan Danielson and Davey Richards from Ring of Honor.

2008 
The 2008 Nippon TV Cup Junior Heavyweight Tag League was held from August 23 to September 6, 2008. The tournament featured eight teams. Outside entrants included Bryan Danielson, Davey Richards and Jay and Mark Briscoe from Ring of Honor.

2009 
The 2009 Nippon TV Cup Junior Heavyweight Tag League ran from July 12 to 27, 2009. The tournament featured two blocks of four teams each. Outside entrants included Bryan Danielson and Roderick Strong from Ring of Honor.

2010 
The 2010 Nippon TV Cup Junior Heavyweight Tag League held from October 15 to October 30, 2010. The tournament featured two blocks of five teams each. Outside entrants included Bryan Danielson and Davey Richards from Ring of Honor, Dick Togo and Yasu Urano from Dramatic Dream Team, The Great Sasuke and Kenbai from Michinoku Pro Wrestling, Atsushi Kotoge and Daisuke Harada from Osaka Pro Wrestling and Extreme Tiger and Jack Evans from AAA.

2011 
The 2011 NTV G+ Cup Junior Heavyweight Tag League was held from July 16 to 30, 2011. The tournament featured two blocks of five teams each. Outside entrants included Delirious and Eddie Edwards from Ring of Honor, Osamu Namiguchi and Tatsuhito Takaiwa from Pro Wrestling Zero1, Kenoh and Kenbai from Michinoku Pro Wrestling, Aero Star and Jack Evans from AAA and Atsushi Kotoge and Daisuke Harada from Osaka Pro Wrestling.

2012 
The 2012 NTV G+ Cup Junior Heavyweight Tag League was held from September 8 to September 22, 2012. The tournament featured two blocks of five teams each. Outside entrants included Bobby Fish and Eddie Edwards from Ring of Honor, Hiro Tonai and Shiori Asahi from Kaientai Dojo and Daichi Hashimoto and Ikuto Hidaka from Pro Wrestling Zero1.

2013 
The 2013 NTV G+ Cup Junior Heavyweight Tag League was held from July 14 to 28, 2013. The tournament featured two blocks of five teams each.outside entrants included Roderick Strong from Ring of Honor, Hiro Tonai and Shiori Asahi from Kaientai Dojo, Jushin Thunder Liger and Tiger Mask from New Japan Pro-Wrestling and Australian wrestler Slex. The winners, Jushin Thunder Liger and Tiger Mask, also won the vacant GHC Junior Heavyweight Tag Team Championship.

2014 
The 2014 NTV G+ Cup Junior Heavyweight Tag League was held from July 19 to August 2, 2014. The tournament featured two blocks of five teams each. Outside entrants included Jushin Thunder Liger and Tiger Mask from New Japan Pro-Wrestling, Hiro Tonai and Shiori Asahi from Kaientai Dojo and Mexican wrestlers Jinzo and Rocky Lobo.

2015 
The 2015 NTV G+ Cup Junior Heavyweight Tag League was held from September 5 to 22, 2015. The tournament featured two blocks of five teams each. The participants were announced on August 23; outside entrants included Kota Umeda and Kudo from Dramatic Dream Team, Kaji Tomato and Shiori Asahi from Kaientai Dojo and freelancers Billyken Kid and Buffalo. Kudo was forced to pull out of the tournament on September 16, after suffering a knee injury, leading to him and Umeda forfeiting their final match.

2016 
The 2016 NTV G+ Cup Junior Heavyweight Tag League took place from July 16 to July 30, 2016.

2017 
The 2017 Global Junior Heavyweight Tag League took place from July 13 to July 27, 2017.

2018 
The 2018 Global Junior Heavyweight Tag League took place from July 7 to August 5, 2018. Leona was initially Seiya Morohashi's partner for the tournament, but he was replaced by Junta Miyawaki due to injury following the match against Hayata & Yo-Hey.

2019 
The 2019 Global Junior Heavyweight Tag League took place from May 28 to June 13, 2019.

2021 
In 2021, the Junior Tag League was switched to the Junior Team Game, in which teams of 4 ('units'), competed in 4v4 elimination tag matches in a single-elimination bracket. It was held on 27 July, at Club Citta, Kawasaki, Kanagawa.

The 4 Units competing were:

 Noah Seiki gun: Daisuke Harada, Atsushi Kotoge, Hajime Ohara & Junta Miyawaki
 Stinger: Hayata, Yoshinari Ogawa, Seiki Yoshioka & Yuya Susumu
 Kongo: Tadasuke, Aleja, Haoh & Nioh
 Perros del Mal de Japon: Nosawa Rongai, Yo-Hey, Kotaro Suzuki & Ikuto Hidaka

Kongo vs Perros

Noah vs Stinger

Kongo vs Noah (Final)

2022 
From 6-7 January, Noah held the inaugural N Innovation U-Cup. It would be contested by the same 4 units who competed last year, only with Dragon Gate's Eita replacing Ikuto Hidaka on the Perros del Mal de Japon team. The format was different, with unit members competing in a tag team match, a Rumble, a six-man tag team match and an elimination 4 way match. For every win a team or individual gets, their unit earned 2 points. A draw would result in a point each. In the case of a points draw, the team who won their head-to-head tag team match would advance.
The top two units would advance to a 4v4 Elimination Tag Team Match final, where each team would start with two of their members in the match. When one was eliminated, another one would enter the match to replace them. When a team was down to one wrestler only, they lost the match.

Rumble

4-Way Match 

Noah vs Kongo (Final)

See also 

AJPW Junior Tag League
Super Junior Tag League

References

External links

Pro Wrestling Noah
Pro Wrestling Noah tournaments
Pro Wrestling Noah shows
Tag team tournaments